Morrissey Provincial Park is a provincial park near the southeastern corner of British Columbia, Canada.  The park is primitive, with no designated picnic or day-use areas, and no available parking.  The park protects a remnant Black Cottonwood (Populus trichocarpa) ecosystem.

References
BC Parks webpage

External links

Provincial parks of British Columbia
Parks in the Regional District of East Kootenay
Elk Valley (British Columbia)
1974 establishments in British Columbia
Protected areas established in 1974